The following is a list of ecoregions in Brazil as identified by the World Wide Fund for Nature (WWF).

Terrestrial ecoregions

by major habitat type

Tropical and subtropical moist broadleaf forests
Alto Paraná Atlantic forests (Argentina, Brazil, Paraguay)
Araucaria moist forests (Argentina, Brazil)
Atlantic Coast restingas (Brazil)
Bahia coastal forests (Brazil)
Bahia interior forests (Brazil)
Caatinga Enclaves moist forests (Brazil)
Fernando de Noronha-Atol das Rocas moist forests (Brazil)
Guayanan Highlands moist forests (Brazil, Colombia, Guyana, Suriname, Venezuela)
Guianan moist forests (Brazil, French Guiana, Guyana, Suriname, Venezuela)
Guianan piedmont and lowland moist forests (Brazil, Venezuela)
Gurupá várzea (Brazil)
Iquitos várzea (Bolivia, Brazil, Peru)
Japurá–Solimões–Negro moist forests (Brazil, Colombia, Venezuela)
Juruá–Purus moist forests (Brazil)
Madeira–Tapajós moist forests (Bolivia, Brazil)
Marajó várzea (Brazil)
Maranhão Babaçu forests (Brazil)
Mato Grosso tropical dry forests (Brazil, Bolivia)
Monte Alegre várzea (Brazil)
Negro–Branco moist forests (Brazil, Colombia, Venezuela)
Northeastern Brazil restingas (Brazil)
Pernambuco coastal forests (Brazil)
Pernambuco interior forests (Brazil)
Purus várzea (Brazil)
Purus–Madeira moist forests (Brazil)
Serra do Mar coastal forests (Brazil)
Solimões–Japurá moist forests (Brazil, Colombia, Peru)
Southwest Amazon moist forests (Bolivia, Brazil, Peru)
Tapajós–Xingu moist forests (Brazil)
Tepuis (Brazil, Guyana, Suriname, Venezuela)
Tocantins–Araguaia–Maranhão moist forests (Brazil)
Uatuma–Trombetas moist forests (Brazil, Guyana, Suriname)
Xingu–Tocantins–Araguaia moist forests (Brazil)

Tropical and subtropical dry broadleaf forests
Atlantic dry forests (Brazil)
Chiquitano dry forests (Bolivia, Brazil)

Tropical and subtropical grasslands, savannas, and shrublands
Campos rupestres (Brazil)
Cerrado (Bolivia, Brazil, Paraguay)
Guianan savanna (Brazil, Guyana, Venezuela)
Humid Chaco (Argentina, Brazil, Bolivia, Paraguay)
Uruguayan savanna (Argentina, Brazil, Uruguay)

Flooded grasslands and savannas
Pantanal (Bolivia, Brazil, Paraguay)

Deserts and xeric shrublands
Caatinga (Brazil)
Saint Peter and Saint Paul rocks (Brazil)

Mangrove
Amapá mangroves (Brazil)
Bahia mangroves (Brazil)
Ilha Grande mangroves (Brazil)
Pará mangroves (Brazil)
Rio Piranhas mangroves (Brazil)
Rio São Francisco mangroves (Brazil)

by bioregion

Orinoco bioregion

Tropical and subtropical moist broadleaf forests
Guayanan Highlands moist forests (Brazil, Colombia, Guyana, Suriname, Venezuela)

Amazonia bioregion

Tropical and subtropical moist broadleaf forests
Caquetá moist forests (Brazil, Colombia)
Guianan moist forests (Brazil, French Guiana, Guyana, Suriname, Venezuela)
Gurupa várzea (Brazil)
Iquitos várzea (Bolivia, Brazil, Peru)
Japurá–Solimões–Negro moist forests (Brazil, Colombia, Venezuela)
Juruá–Purus moist forests (Brazil)
Madeira–Tapajós moist forests (Bolivia, Brazil)
Marajó várzea (Brazil)
Maranhão Babaçu forests (Brazil)
Mato Grosso tropical dry forests (Brazil, Bolivia)
Monte Alegre várzea (Brazil)
Negro–Branco moist forests (Brazil, Colombia, Venezuela)
Purus varzea (Brazil)
Purus–Madeira moist forests (Brazil, Bolivia)
Rio Negro campinarana (Brazil, Colombia)
Solimões–Japurá moist forests (Brazil, Colombia, Peru)
Southwest Amazon moist forests (Bolivia, Brazil, Peru)
Tapajós–Xingu moist forests (Brazil)
Tocantins–Araguaia–Maranhão moist forests (Brazil)
Uatuma–Trombetas moist forests (Brazil, Guyana, Suriname)
Xingu–Tocantins–Araguaia moist forests (Brazil)

Tropical and subtropical dry broadleaf forests
Chiquitano dry forests (Bolivia, Brazil)

Tropical and subtropical grasslands, savannas, and shrublands
Beni savanna (Bolivia, Brazil, Peru)
Guianan savanna (Brazil, Guyana, Venezuela)

Eastern South America bioregion

Tropical and subtropical moist broadleaf forests
Alto Paraná Atlantic forests (Argentina, Brazil, Paraguay)
Araucaria moist forests (Argentina, Brazil)
Atlantic Coast restingas (Brazil)
Bahia coastal forests (Brazil)
Bahia interior forests (Brazil)
Caatinga enclaves moist forests (Brazil)
Fernando de Noronha-Atol das Rocas moist forests (Brazil)
Northeastern Brazil restingas (Brazil)
Pernambuco coastal forests (Brazil)
Pernambuco interior forests (Brazil)
Serra do Mar coastal forests (Brazil)
Trinidade-Martin Vaz Islands tropical forests (Brazil)

Tropical and subtropical dry broadleaf forests
Atlantic dry forests (Brazil)

Flooded grasslands and savannas
Pantanal (Bolivia, Brazil, Paraguay)

Tropical and subtropical grasslands, savannas, and shrublands
Campos rupestres (Brazil)
Cerrado (Bolivia, Brazil, Paraguay)
Humid Chaco (Argentina, Brazil, Bolivia, Paraguay)

Deserts and xeric shrublands
Caatinga (Brazil)
Saint Peter and Saint Paul rocks (Brazil)

Southern South America bioregion

Tropical and subtropical grasslands, savannas, and shrublands
Uruguayan savanna (Argentina, Brazil, Uruguay)

Mangroves
by mangrove complex

Amazon-Orinoco-Maranhao complex
Amapá mangroves (Brazil)
Guianan mangroves (French Guiana, Guyana, Suriname, Venezuela, Brazil)
Maranhão mangroves (Brazil)
Pará mangroves (Brazil)

Northeast Brazil complex
Bahia mangroves (Brazil)
Rio Piranhas mangroves (Brazil)
Rio São Francisco mangroves (Brazil)

Southeast Brazil complex
Ilha Grande mangroves (Brazil)

Freshwater ecoregions

by freshwater complex

Guiana/Orinoco Complex

 Eastern Morichal (Venezuela)
 Orinoco Delta (Venezuela)
 Southern Orinoco (Venezuela)
 Guiana Watershed (Brazil, French Guiana, Guyana, Suriname, Venezuela)

Amazon Complex

 Amazon Delta (Brazil)
 Amazon Main Channel (Brazil, Peru)
 Northern Amazon Shield Tributaries (Brazil)
 Rio Negro (Brazil, Colombia, Venezuela)
 Upper Amazon Piedmont (Bolivia, Colombia, Ecuador, Peru)
 Western Amazon Lowlands (Bolivia, Brazil, Peru)
 Central Brazilian Shield Tributaries (Bolivia, Brazil)
 Tocantins-Araguaia (Brazil)

Northeast Atlantic Complex

 Maranhao (Brazil)

Mata-Atlantica Complex

 Northeast Mata-Atlantica (Brazil)
 East Mata-Atlantica (Brazil)
 Southeast Mata-Atlantica (Brazil)

São Francisco Complex

 Caatinga (Brazil)
 Cerrado (Brazil)

Upper Parana Complex

 Alto Paraná Atlantic forests (Brazil)

Beni Savanna (Llanos de Moxos) Complex

 Llanos de Moxos (Bolivia, Brazil)

Paraguay-Parana Complex

 Pantanal (Bolivia, Brazil, Paraguay)
 Lower Parana (Argentina, Brazil, Paraguay, Uruguay)

Southern Atlantic Complex

 Jacui Highlands (Brazil, Uruguay)
 Lagoa dos Patos Coastal Plain (Brazil, Uruguay)

Marine ecoregions
by marine realm and marine province

Tropical Atlantic

North Brazil Shelf
 Guianan marine ecoregion
 Amazonia

Tropical Southwestern Atlantic
 Sao Pedro and Sao Paulo Islands
 Fernando de Noronha and Atol das Rocas
 Northeastern Brazil marine ecoregion
 Eastern Brazil marine ecoregion
 Trindade and Martin Vaz Islands

Temperate South America

Warm Temperate Southwestern Atlantic
 Southeastern Brazil
 Rio Grande

See also 
 Protected areas of Brazil
 Lista de espécies da flora do Brasil
 Biomes in Brazil

References
 Dinerstein, Eric; David Olson; Douglas J. Graham; et al. (1995). A Conservation Assessment of the Terrestrial Ecoregions of Latin America and the Caribbean. World Bank, Washington DC, .
 Olson, D., Dinerstein, E., Canevari, P., Davidson, I., Castro, G., Morisset, V., Abell, R., and Toledo, E.; eds. (1998). Freshwater Biodiversity of Latin America and the Caribbean: A Conservation Assessment. Biodiversity Support Program, Washington DC, .
 Spalding, Mark D., Helen E. Fox, Gerald R. Allen, Nick Davidson et al. "Marine Ecoregions of the World: A Bioregionalization of Coastal and Shelf Areas". Bioscience Vol. 57 No. 7, July/August 2007, pp. 573-583, .

 01
Brazil
Ecoregions
ecoregions